Statistics of the Scottish Football League in season 1900–01.

Scottish League Division One

Scottish League Division Two

See also
1900–01 in Scottish football

References

 
1900-01